Pradyut is a given name. Notable people with the name include:

Pradyut Bordoloi (born 1958), Indian politician
Pradyut Ghosh (born 1970), Indian chemist